List of cider and perry producers in the United Kingdom and their brands.

Cider and perry producers

References

External links
Welsh Perry and Cider Society
South West of England Cidermakers’ Association
Three Counties Cider and Perry Association
CAMRA Cider and Perry

Cider
Cider
British ciders